Richard Alvern Lowe  (1854–1922) was a professional baseball player who played catcher in the Major Leagues for the 1884 Detroit Wolverines.

External links

1854 births
1922 deaths
Major League Baseball catchers
Detroit Wolverines players
19th-century baseball players
Baseball players from Wisconsin
People from Evansville, Wisconsin